The Battle off Cape Gata, which took place June 17, 1815, off the south-east coast of Spain, was the first battle of the Second Barbary War. A squadron of vessels, under the command of Stephen Decatur, Jr., met and engaged the flagship of the Algerine Navy, the frigate  under Admiral Hamidou. After a sharp action, Decatur's squadron was able to capture the Algerine frigate and win a decisive victory over the Algerines.

Background
Stephen Decatur's squadron had left New York on May 20, 1815, with orders to destroy Algerine vessels and bring the Dey of Algiers to terms for attacking American shipping. He reached the Strait of Gibraltar on June 15, 1815, and began his mission. After learning that several Algerine cruisers had crossed the Strait of Gibraltar shortly before he did, Commodore Stephen Decatur, Jr. decided to give them chase and cut them off before they could reach Algiers.

Battle
Commanding a fleet of nine vessels, he encountered the Algerine flagship Mashouda (also spelled 'Mashuda' or 'Meshuda') of forty-six guns off Cape Gata, Spain. Being heavily outnumbered the admiral, Rais Hamidou, decided to try to flee to the port of Algiers, but was overtaken by the American squadron.

The Constellation and the sloop  were able to close in and hammer the Algerine frigate. Firing a devastating broadside, the Guerriere crippled the enemy and killed the Algerine admiral. Decatur ceased firing, expecting the Algerine ship to surrender. Instead the Algerines continued to fight hopelessly with muskets as long as they were able. As a result, Decatur had the sloop  fire nine broadsides into the Meshuda with disastrous effect. The bloodied Algerines then struck their colors and ended the battle.

Aftermath
Four hundred and six Algerines were captured, with most being wounded as well as thirty killed. The American losses were remarkably light, with only four dead and ten wounded (all on the Guerriere). Most of the American casualties were due to a gun explosion, but a few were due to enemy action. After sending the captured frigate off to Cartagena, Decatur continued to cruise towards Algiers. However, his squadron encountered another Algerine cruiser off Cape Palos.  After engaging and capturing the cruiser Decatur was finally able to make it to Algiers. The loss of the Meshuda and Admiral Hamidou greatly weakened Algerine morale as well as their naval capabilities. Once the American squadron reached Algiers they met no further opposition and by a mere show of force were able to bring the Dey to terms, thus ending the war.

Bibliography
 Url
 Url
"Victory in Tripoli", by Joshua E. London pgs, 237-239
Dictionary of American Fighting Ships:Epervier

References

Cape Gata
Naval battles involving Ottoman Algeria
Conflicts in 1815
1815 in Africa
1815 in the Ottoman Empire
June 1815 events